Seven Slaps (German: Sieben Ohrfeigen) is a 1937 German comedy film directed by Paul Martin and starring Lilian Harvey, Willy Fritsch and Alfred Abel. Like the earlier Lucky Kids, which had the same director and stars, it was an attempt to create a German version of screwball comedy. While the previous film had a New York setting, this takes place in London. It was shot at the Babelsberg Studios in Berlin. The film's sets were designed by the art director Erich Kettelhut. It was loosely remade in 1970 as Slap in the Face.

Synopsis
After he loses some money on the stock exchange a young man seeks revenge on the speculator responsible by slapping him. He intends to slap him once every day for a week as retribution, but things become complicated when he becomes entangled with the speculator's attractive daughter.

Cast
 Lilian Harvey as Daisy Terbanks - Astor's Daughter  
 Willy Fritsch as William Tenson MacPhab  
 Alfred Abel as Astor Terbanks - sein Finanzgewaltiger  
 Oskar Sima as Wennington Laskett - Reporter  
 Erich Fiedler as Ernie Earl of Wigglebottom  
 Ernst Legal as Mr. Strawman  
 Otz Tollen as Balthasar Adula Flanelli - Verwandlungskünstler  
 Ernst Behmer as Bankangestellter  
 Erwin Biegel as Aufgeregter bankkunde 
 Erich Dunskus as Schmiedegeselle in Gretna Green  
 Max Hiller as 1. Zuschauer beim Fußballspiel  
 Horst Birr as Schmiedegeselle in Gretna Green  
 Jac Diehl as Schutzmann  
 Karl Harbacher as Sekretär Charly  
 Hanns Waschatko as Butler Leslie  
 Rudolf Klicks as 1. Bankdirektor  
 F.W. Schröder-Schrom as 2. Bankdirektor  
 Otto Stoeckel as 3. Bankdirektor  
 Josef Reithofer as Detektiv 
 Georg H. Schnell as Dr. Lorenz  
 Walter Steinweg as Chauffeur von Dr. Lorenz  
 Max Wilmsen as Conférencier im Rostigen Nagel  
 Charles Francois as Ein Mitarbeiter von Astor Terbanks  
 Paul Ludwig Frey as Ein Gast im Kabarett 'Rostiger Nagel'  
 Eric Harden as Ein Zeitung lesendes Klubmitglied  
 Albert Karchow as 2. Zuschauer beim Fußballspiel  
 Gustav Püttjer as 3. Zuschauer beim Fußballspiel  
 Paul Schwed as Detektiv  
 Egon Stief as Starker Mann beim Fußballspiel  
 Alfred Stratmann as Büroangestellter

References

Bibliography 
 Eric Rentschler. The Ministry of Illusion: Nazi Cinema and Its Afterlife. Harvard University Press, 1996.

External links 
 

1937 films
Films of Nazi Germany
German comedy films
1937 comedy films
1930s German-language films
Films directed by Paul Martin
Films set in London
UFA GmbH films
German black-and-white films
Films based on Hungarian novels
1930s German films
Films shot at Babelsberg Studios